Hasselblad is a Swedish camera manufacturer.

It may also refer to:
Victor Hasselblad, company founder
Hasselblad Masters Award, award granted by the company
Hasselblad Foundation, not-for-profit foundation
Hasselblad Award, granted by the foundation